Nachit (also Romanized as Nāchīt; also known as Nichit) is a village in Akhtachi-ye Sharqi Rural District of Simmineh District of Bukan County, West Azerbaijan province, Iran. At the 2006 National Census, its population was 1,552 in 269 households. The following census in 2011 counted 1,833 people in 468 households. The latest census in 2016 showed a population of 2,850 people in 827 households; it was the largest village in its rural district.

References 

Bukan County

Populated places in West Azerbaijan Province

Populated places in Bukan County